The 2013 Masters (officially the 2013 Betfair Masters) was a professional non-ranking snooker tournament held between 13 and 20 January 2013 at the Alexandra Palace in London, England. This was the first time that Betfair sponsored the event. The event was broadcast live on Eurosport and BBC.

Mark Selby won his third Masters title by defeating defending champion Neil Robertson 10–6 in the final. With this Selby became the sixth player to win the Masters more than two times after Cliff Thorburn, Stephen Hendry, Paul Hunter, Steve Davis and Ronnie O'Sullivan. Selby also became the first player to win back-to-back Triple Crown titles since Mark Williams 10 years before. This was Selby's 11th professional title.

Field
Defending champion Neil Robertson was the number 1 seed. World Champion Ronnie O'Sullivan did not compete. The remaining places were allocated to players based on the latest world rankings (revision 3) except that Stephen Lee, ranked 9, did not play because he was suspended. As a consequence Mark Davis, ranked 17, was invited and seeded 16.

Prize fund
The total prize money of £500,000 was unchanged from the previous year but the distribution was changed with the winner receiving £175,000, an increase of £25,000. The breakdown of prize money for this year is shown below:
Winner: £175,000
Runner-up: £85,000
Semi-finals: £40,000
Quarter-finals: £20,000
Last 16: £9,000
Highest break: £8,000
Total: £500,000

Main draw

Final

Century breaks
Total: 20
 138, 136  Mark Allen
 132, 127, 111, 105, 101, 100  Neil Robertson
 131, 110  Stephen Maguire
 130  Shaun Murphy
 127, 103  Ding Junhui
 117  John Higgins
 111, 111  Graeme Dott
 109  Barry Hawkins
 107, 105  Judd Trump
 102  Mark Selby

References

External links
 The Masters 2013 pictures by MoniqueLimbos at Photobucket
 Behind the scenes shots of the 2013 Betfair Masters – Pictures by World Snooker at Facebook

Masters (snooker)
Masters
Masters (snooker)
Masters (snooker)
Masters